Euproctis  mayottensis is a moth of the family Erebidae first described by Cyril Leslie Collenette in 1956. It is found in Mayotte.

References
Collenette, C. L. (1956). "Further new and little-known African Lymantriidae". Annals and Magazine of Natural History. (12) 8 (93), 1955: 644, pl. 16, fig. 6.

Lymantriinae
Moths described in 1856